Kartini Schools, named for the Javanese women's rights advocate Raden Ajeng Kartini (Lady Kartini), were opened to educate indigenous girls in the Dutch East Indies in the wake of the Dutch Ethical Policy.

About 
The first Kartini School was opened in Batavia in 1907. It was supported by Governor General Abendanon and Queen Wilhelmina of the Netherlands. Additional Kartini Schools were opened in Malang, Cirebon, Semarang, Bogor (then called Buitzenborg), and Surabaya. The schools served indigenous students who had already received a primary education.

Efforts to create opportunities for upper-class Javanese women struggled against opposition from Conservative Dutch officials and the Javanese regent class (bupatis). The Dutch language boarding schools were staffed by women.

Curriculum
The curriculum included:
 Continuing Dutch language instruction
 Javanese language and literature
 geography and history
 drawing and aesthetics
 home economics and gardening
 arithmetic and simple bookkeeping
 practical and fine needlework
 principles of hygiene and first aid
 principles of education
 singing and principles of musical theory

See also
Dutch Ethical Policy

References

Dutch East Indies society
Schools in Indonesia